The superhero Spider-Man has appeared in many American comic books published by Marvel Comics since he first appeared in Amazing Fantasy #15 (August 1962). The character has since been featured in various storylines, forming longer story arcs. These particular arcs have been given special names and have gone through various reprints over the years. During the 1960s and 1970s, these story arcs normally only lasted three issues or less (sometimes only one, such as the classic story "Spider-Man No More!") and would appear in Spider-Man's main comic book title The Amazing Spider-Man. "The Death of Jean DeWolff" was the first popular story arc outside The Amazing Spider-Man, as it appeared in the third monthly ongoing series of The Spectacular Spider-Man.

Description
Starting in the 1980s, more Spider-Man comic book titles became popular, with Spider-Man storylines being connected to different comics. Story arcs become longer than in previous decades, such as "Kraven's Last Hunt", "Maximum Carnage", and the "Clone Saga". Spider-Man story arcs could be found in titles such as The Amazing Spider-Man, The Spectacular Spider-Man, Web of Spider-Man, Spider-Man Unlimited, and Peter Parker: Spider-Man.  During the 21st century, the more popular Spider-Man story arcs would mostly be found in The Amazing Spider-Man, with some arcs taking as long as a year to complete.

Comics such as "Secret Wars", "Spider-Island" and "Dead No More: The Clone Conspiracy" are crossover comic books and sometimes move away from Spider-Man titles and involve other comic books.

Known storylines

See also 
 List of Spider-Man titles

References

External links
 Spider-Man Story arcs, on Marvel Wikia

Spider-Man storylines
Spider-Man lists
Lists of comic book story arcs